A vertical slice (VS) is a type of milestone, benchmark, or deadline, with emphasis on demonstrating progress across all components of a project. It may have originated in the video game industry.

The term vertical slice refers to a cross-sectional slice through the layers that form the structure of the software code base. It is mostly used in Scrum terminology where the work is planned in terms of features (or stories). For example, as a very basic approach, a software project may consist of three layers (or components):
 Data access layer (bottom)
 Business logic layer (middle)
 User interface layer (top)

In this common approach, a vertical slice means a bit of every layer. Again as an example, a new feature request like "showing x information on main screen" would contain these work bits:
 Work in the UX/UI that will display the information
 Work in the service layer to transform the information
 Work in the database layer to store / fetch the information.

So a vertical slice can be defined as "the sum of the work that has to be done in every layer that is involved in getting a specific feature working." A vertical slice doesn't necessarily affect every component in the software. For example, if the solution contains a web service, it would live in the same "floor" as the UI, and a feature like "supporting login/logout in webservice" that involves only the web service does not require a change in the UI, but the business and database access layers.

Vertical user stories
A vertical user story encapsulates the action of one function.

An example of a vertical user story is, "As an end user I must be able to log into my company portal so that I can perform the functions of my job."

Acceptance criteria
Acceptance criteria are conditions of satisfaction. This story is "done" when the detailed functionalities are completed. 

For example:
 Verify that I can log into the system
 Verify that my login credentials will be remembered
 Verify that I can reset my own password by clicking the "Forgot Password" link
 Verify that I cannot navigate back to the landing page without first logging in

Dissected by layer
As a developer, you will need to think about every file encapsulated in each layer that needs to be created and/or extended in order to complete this "Login User" story.

Sources

 Vertical Slicing Training Deck by Ben Clay (Enterprise Scaled Scrum 2009)
 Built to Thrive by Jay van Zyl
 Horizontal and Vertical User Stories - Slicing the Cake by Ned Kremic
 INVEST IN GOOD STORIES, AND SMART TASKS by Bill Wake
 6 Brilliant Ways to Slice User Stories by Dominic Krimmer
 User Stories 2.0 by Jeff Sutherland

Project management techniques